Leon Eric Brooks III, better known by his stage name Kix Brooks (born May 12, 1955), is an American country music artist, actor, and film producer best known for being one half of the duo Brooks & Dunn and host of radio's American Country Countdown. Prior to the duo's foundation, he was a singer and songwriter, charting twice on Hot Country Songs and releasing an album for Capitol Records. Brooks and Ronnie Dunn comprised Brooks & Dunn for twenty years, then both members began solo careers. Brooks's solo career after Brooks & Dunn includes the album New to This Town.

In 2019, Brooks & Dunn were inducted into the Country Music Hall of Fame.

Early life
Brooks grew up in Shreveport, Louisiana. He has a sister, a half-sister, and a half-brother; his father also adopted a son of his third wife. After graduating from the former Sewanee Military Academy, an Episcopal school in Sewanee, Tennessee, Brooks attended Louisiana Tech University in Ruston as a theatre arts major. He moved to Alaska to work with his father on an oil pipeline for one summer, then returned to Louisiana Tech to finish his education. After graduating, he moved to Maine to write advertising for a company owned by his sister and brother-in-law.

Musical career

Brooks' father urged him to pursue his desire to become a musician, and he moved to Nashville, Tennessee, in the early 1980s.  His then-girlfriend (now wife Barbara, with whom he has a son and daughter) followed shortly thereafter.  He worked for Tree Publishing as a staff songwriter.  He recorded his first solo single, "Baby, When Your Heart Breaks Down", for Avion in 1983, but returned to songwriting after it only reached number 73 on the Hot Country Songs chart. Brooks and Dan Tyler co-wrote "Modern Day Romance", released by Nitty Gritty Dirt Band in June 1985; it became the band's second No. 1 hit on the country chart.

Brooks released an album, Kix Brooks, in 1989 on Capitol Records. This album also featured the song "Sacred Ground" which became a No. 2 country hit for McBride & the Ride in 1992.

He was one half of country music duo Brooks & Dunn. Their 1991 debut album, Brand New Man, generated four number-one hit singles on the country charts.  Brooks usually provided backing vocals on their songs and singles.  The singles featuring Brooks on lead vocals include, "You're Gonna Miss Me When I'm Gone", rising to No. 1, "Lost and Found", "Rock My World (Little Country Girl)", "Mama Don't Get Dressed Up for Nothing", "South of Santa Fe", and "Why Would I Say Goodbye".

On August 10, 2009, Brooks & Dunn announced to their fans, via their website they intended to disband after twenty years of touring. According to the short statement released on their web site, Brooks & Dunn intended to release a greatest hits album, tour during the rest of 2009, and have a farewell tour in 2010.

Brooks resumed his solo career in 2012, releasing a new 12-track album on September 11, 2012. New to This Town features nine songs co-written by Brooks, including the album's first single, the title track. He followed his second album with the soundtrack to the western film Ambush at Dark Canyon in 2014.  Brooks composed the majority of the musical score as well as starring in the film.

On December 3, 2014, Brooks & Dunn reunited, and along with Reba McEntire, performed a series of concerts in Las Vegas, Nevada, throughout the summer and fall of 2015.

Brooks performed at the 2019 Musicians Hall of Fame and Museum Concert and Induction Ceremony.

Awards
In 2005, Brooks, along with timber industrialist Roy O. Martin Jr., and the Louisiana State University sports legends Paul Dietzel, and Sue Gunter were among those named a "Louisiana Legend" by Louisiana Public Broadcasting.

Other achievements

Since January 2006, Brooks has hosted American Country Countdown, a syndicated radio countdown show based on Mediabase (originally was BILLBOARD, from 2006 to August 2009), country charts. Brooks succeeded the show's former host, Bob Kingsley. Brooks is also co-owner of Arrington Vineyards, a Nashville winery with winemaker Kip Summers and businessmen John Russell.

In 2013, Kix launched the film company Team Two Entertainment along with Eric Brooks. The company makes independent films Kix produces, and Kix occasionally appears as an actor.

In 2015, Brooks contracted with Cooking Channel to host Steak Out with Kix Brooks, in which he travels around America in search of the best steakhouses.

Discography

Albums

Singles

As a featured artist

Music videos

Filmography

Film

Television

Notes

References

Louisiana Tech University alumni
American country singer-songwriters
American male singer-songwriters
American radio personalities
Grammy Award winners
American mandolinists
Louisiana Republicans
Tennessee Republicans
Musicians from Shreveport, Louisiana
1955 births
Living people
Brooks & Dunn members
Country musicians from Louisiana
Capitol Records artists
Arista Nashville artists
Actors from Shreveport, Louisiana
Singer-songwriters from Louisiana